Horan is a surname that originated in County Galway, Ireland, and from there spread into County Mayo.

Notable people with the name Horan include:

Alice Horan (1895–1971), British trade unionist
Adelind Horan (born 1988), American actress
Charles Horan (1837–1900), Catholic priest in Australia
Claude Horan (1917–2014), American sculptor
Daniel Horan (born 1983), American Catholic priest, theologian, and author
Gerard Horan (born 1962), English actor
Hume Horan (1934–2004), American diplomat
James Horan (1911–1986), Irish monsignor
James Horan (actor) (born 1954), American character actor
John Horan (politician) (1908–1971), Canadian politician
John Horan (rugby league), rugby league footballer who played in the 1930s and 1940s
Johnny Horan (1932–1980), American basketball player
Kate Horan (born 1975), New Zealand paralympics runner
Lindsey Horan (born 1994), United States (soccer) football player
Marcus Horan (born 1977), Irish rugby union player
Mike Horan (American football) (born 1959), American football punter
Monica Horan (born 1963), American actress
Neil Horan (born 1947), defrocked Irish Roman Catholic clergyman
Niall Horan (born 1993), Irish singer and member of the band One Direction
Patrick Horan (c. 1800s), Irish baseball player
Peter Horan (born 1926), Irish flute & fiddle player
Tim Horan (born 1970), Australian rugby union player
Tom Horan (1854–1916), Australian cricketer & journalist
Walt Horan (born 1898), American politician
Michael Horan (born 1981), English actor vocalist and stuntman

See also
Roger Ó hUghróin (died 1616), Chief of the Name

References

Surnames of Irish origin
Anglicised Irish-language surnames